Jimmy Ferguson (19 October 1903 – 23 April 1992) was a Scotland international rugby union player and his regular playing position was Prop. After his playing career, he became a rugby union referee.

Rugby Union career

Amateur career

Ferguson played as a forward for Gala.

International career

Ferguson was capped for Scotland for one match in 1928. This was the Home Nations match against Wales.

Referee career

Ferguson refereed the Inter-City match between Glasgow District and Edinburgh District in 1936.

References

1903 births
1992 deaths
Scottish rugby union players
Scotland international rugby union players
Rugby union props
Rugby union players from Edinburgh
Scottish rugby union referees
Scottish Districts referees
Gala RFC players